Riccardo is a male given name, Italian version of Ricardo or Richard.  It also may be a surname.  It means "Powerful Leader".

It may refer to:

People

A–L
Riccardo Antoniazzi (1853–1912), Italian violin maker
Riccardo Bacchelli (1891–1985), writer
Riccardo Barthelemy (1869–1955), Italian composer
Riccardo Bauer (1896–1982), Italian journalist and politician
Riccardo Bertazzolo (1903–1975), Italian boxer
Riccardo Billi (1906–1982), Italian film actor and comedian
Riccardo Bocchino (born 1988), Italian rugby union player
Riccardo Bonetto (born 1979), Italian football player
Riccardo Brengola (1917–2004), Italian violinist
Riccardo Broschi (1698–1795), composer, brother of famous castrato singer Carlo Broschi
Riccardo Burchielli (born 1975), Italian artist
Riccardo Calimani (born 1946), Italian writer and historian
Riccardo Campa (born 1967), Italian professor
Riccardo Campogiani (1990–2007), Swedish assault victim
Riccardo Carapellese (1922–1995), Italian football player and football manager
Riccardo Cassin (1909–2009), Italian mountaineer
Riccardo Chailly (born 1953), Italian conductor
Riccardo Chiarini (born 1984), Italian road bicycle racer
Riccardo Colombo (born  1982), Italian football player
Riccardo Cocciante (born 1946), Italo-French singer, songwriter and composer
Riccardo Corallo (born 1980), Italian football player
Riccardo Cucciolla 1924–1999), Italian film actor
Riccardo Divora (1908–1951), Italian rower
Riccardo Drigo (1846–1930), Italian composer of ballet music and Italian Opera, a theatrical conductor and virtuoso pianist
Riccardo Ferri (born 1963), Italian football player
Riccardo Fissore (born 1980), Italian football player
Riccardo Francovich (1946–2007), Italian archaeologist
Riccardo Freda (1909–1999), film director
Riccardo Fogli (born 1947), Italian singer
Riccardo Gabbiadini (born 1970), Welsh footballer
Riccardo Galeazzi-Lisi (1891–1968), Italian medical doctor
Riccardo Garrone (1926–2016), Italian actor
Riccardo Garrone (1936–2013), Italian entrepreneur and football chairman
Riccardo Giacconi (1931–2018), Italian-born American Nobel Prize-winning astrophysicist
Riccardo Illy (born 1955), Italian businessman
Riccardo Ingram (1966–2015), US baseball player and coach
Riccardo Lione (born 1972), Italian beach volleyball player

M–Z
Riccardo Magrini (born 1954), Italian road bicycle racer
Riccardo Maniero (born 1987), Italian football player
Riccardo Martin (1874–1952), American tenor
Riccardo Maspero (born 1970), Italian football player
Riccardo Materazzi (born 1963), Italian athlete
Riccardo Meggiorini (born 1985), Italian football player
Riccardo Meili (born 1982), footballer
Riccardo Montolivo (born 1985), football player
Riccardo Morandi (1902–1989), Italian civil engineer
Riccardo Moscatelli (1971–1999), Italian race car driver
Riccardo Muccioli (born 1974), football player from San Marino
Riccardo Muti (born 1941), Italian conductor
Riccardo Nardini (born 1983), Italian football player
Riccardo Nencini (born 1959), Italian politician
Riccardo Pacifici (1904–1943), Italian Sephardic Jew deported to Auschwitz during World War II
Riccardo Paletti (1958–1982), Formula One driver
Riccardo Pampuri (1897–1930), Italian medical doctor
Riccardo Patrese (born 1954), Formula One driver
Riccardo Pazzaglia (1926–2006), actor, film director, screenwriter and songwriter
Riccardo Piacentini (born 1958), Italian composer and pianist
Riccardo Pittis (born 1968), Italian basketball player
Riccardo Riccò (born 1983), Italian road bicycle racer
Riccardo Rognoni (c. 1550–1620), Italian composer and violinist
Riccardo Romagnoli (born 1963), Italian auto racing driver
Riccardo Scamarcio (born 1979), Italian actor
Riccardo Schicchi (1953–2012), Italian pornographer
Riccardo Scimeca (born 1975), English footballer
Riccardo di Segni (born 1949), chief rabbi of Rome
Riccardo Silva (born 1970), Italian businessman
Riccardo Staglianò (born 1968), Italian journalist
Riccardo Stracciari (1875–1955), Italian baritone
Riccardo Taddei (born 1980), Italian football player
Riccardo Tesi (born 1956), Italian musician
Riccardo Tisci (born 1974), Italian fashion designer
Riccardo Torriani (1911–1988), Swiss ice hockey player and luger
Riccardo Truccolo (born 1989), Italian basketball player
Riccardo Ventre (born 1944), Italian politician
Riccardo Zadra, Italian pianist
Riccardo Zandonai (1883–1944), Italian opera composer
Riccardo Zanella (1896–1947), Italian politician
Riccardo Zampagna (born 1974), Italian footballer
Riccardo Vianello or Raimondo Vianello (1922–2010), Italian film actor

Other
Riccardo Primo, or Riccardo Primo re d’Inghilterra, opera in three acts by George Frideric Handel
Daniel Ricciardo, Australian Formula One driver

See also
Ricardo (disambiguation)

Italian masculine given names
Italian names of Germanic origin